Joaquín de Frías y Moya (1784 in Cádiz, Spain – 1851 in Madrid, Spain) was a Spanish military figure and politician who served as Minister of State and of Marine in 1843. 

|-

Foreign ministers of Spain
1784 births
1851 deaths
Progressive Party (Spain) politicians